Aaron Labonte (born 27 November 1983) is an English former professional footballer. Labonte, who started his career as a trainee with Newcastle United, has previously played for Dunfermline Athletic and Finn Harps.

Career
Labonte started his career as a trainee for English Premiership side Newcastle United in 2001. In January 2003, then Livingston manager Jim Leishman offered Labonte a trial. The trial was unsuccessful, but 5 months later Labonte was handed a trial by fellow SPL side Dunfermline Athletic. After a successful trial, Labonte was offered a -year contract with the club. Labonte made his debut in the 4–0 defeat to Glasgow side Rangers.

In the 2004 Scottish Cup Final defeat to Celtic, Bhoys striker Henrik Larsson twice evaded Labonte and scored both times. After relegation to the First Division, then manager Stephen Kenny told Labonte that he was not needed by the club. On the deadline day for transfers in 2008, Labonte signed on loan until the end of the season for Irish club Finn Harps. He was released by Dunfermline in May 2008 after his contract ended and was re-signed by Finn Harps.

See also
2007–08 Dunfermline Athletic F.C. season

References

External links

1983 births
Living people
Footballers from Middlesbrough
Association football defenders
English footballers
Newcastle United F.C. players
Dunfermline Athletic F.C. players
Finn Harps F.C. players
Scottish Premier League players
Scottish Football League players
League of Ireland players